Leonardo Mayer was the defending champion, but lost in the final to Nikoloz Basilashvili, 4–6, 6–0, 5–7. This was Basilashvili's first ATP World Tour title, as well as the first ATP title won by a Georgian player since Alexander Metreveli.

Seeds

Draw

Finals

Top half

Bottom half

Qualifying

Seeds

Qualifiers

Lucky loser
  Thiago Monteiro

Qualifying draw

First qualifier

Second qualifier

Third qualifier

Fourth qualifier

References
Main draw
Qualifying draw

German Open - Singles
2018 International German Open